Viktor Palagin (born 12 June 1945) is a Soviet diver. He competed in the men's 10 metre platform event at the 1964 Summer Olympics, coming in second place during the Qualifying Round, and in fifth place in the Finals.

References

1945 births
Living people
Soviet male divers
Olympic divers of the Soviet Union
Divers at the 1964 Summer Olympics
Place of birth missing (living people)